The 1924–25 season was the 16th year of football played by Dundee United, and covers the period from 1 July 1924 to 30 June 1925.

Match results
Dundee United played a total of 40 matches during the 1924–25 season.

Legend

All results are written with Dundee United's score first.
Own goals in italics

Second Division

Scottish Cup

References

Dundee United F.C. seasons
Dundee United